Flair Software was a British video game developer and publisher of the 1990s that developed and published games for the Amiga, Amiga CD32, Atari ST, Commodore 64, DOS, PlayStation, Sega Saturn and SNES. It was set up by Colin Courtney in 1990 after his previous company, Tynesoft, went bankrupt. It retained Tynesoft's MicroValue brand and published Elvira: The Arcade Game which had originally been scheduled for publication by Tynesoft.

The company is mainly associated with popular and colourful Amiga games as Trolls, Oscar and Whizz. In 1993 platformer Oscar was bundled with Millennium's Diggers as launch bundle for the Amiga CD32 and it was considered one of the mascot games for the failed system. Flair Software's 1994 fighting game Dangerous Streets (that was a pack-in game for the CD32 later in its lifespan) is generally considered one of the worst games of all time.

The games Trolls and Oscar were remade and re-released in 2010 as Nintendo DSiware by Virtual Playground (part of the MicroValue group of companies) under the new titles Oscar in Toyland (since the Trolls licence couldn't be used any more) and Oscar in Movieland. In 2011 Virtual Playground also released two new original Oscar games (Oscar in Toyland 2 and Oscar's World Tour) for DSiware.

The company currently operates under the name Casual Arts and releases games for PC, Mac, Nintendo DS/3DS, iOS, Android and Kindle.

Selected Games
 Turn n' Burn (1990, Amiga, Atari ST, Commodore 64, DOS)
 Elvira: Mistress of the Dark (1991, Commodore 64) (publisher)
 Elvira: The Arcade Game (1991, Amiga, Atari ST, Commodore 64, DOS)
 Euro Soccer (1992, Amiga, DOS)
 Trolls (1992, Amiga, Amiga CD32, Commodore 64, DOS)
 Oscar (1993, Amiga, Amiga CD32, DOS, SNES)
 Surf Ninjas (1993, Amiga CD32)
 Dangerous Streets (1994, Amiga, Amiga CD32, DOS)
 Summer Olympix (1994, Amiga CD32)
 Whizz (1994, Amiga, DOS, PlayStation, Sega Saturn, SNES)
 Rally Championships (1994, Amiga, DOS)
 Soccer Superstars (1995, Amiga, Amiga CD32, DOS)
 Realm (1996, SNES)
 Time Paradox (1996, DOS)
 MegaMorph (1997, DOS)
 Double Agent (1998, Windows, Amiga)
 Jungle Legend (1999, Windows)

References

Defunct video game companies of the United Kingdom